Trupanea hendeli is a species of tephritid or fruit flies in the genus Trupanea of the family Tephritidae.

Distribution
Peru, Bolivia, Argentina, Brazil.

References

Tephritinae
Insects described in 1941
Diptera of South America